The first lady of North Dakota is the unofficial title of the wife of the governor of North Dakota. The state's current first lady is Kathryn Helgaas Burgum since 2016.

List of first ladies of North Dakota

References

 
Government of North Dakota

First Ladies